The 1999 Cleveland Browns season was the Browns 51st season overall and 47th in the NFL. It marked the return of professional football to the city of Cleveland, Ohio for the first time since the 1995 season, when the franchise was temporarily deactivated following the Cleveland Browns relocation controversy, which ultimately established the Baltimore Ravens. While technically an expansion franchise, the team officially and legally are considered a continuation of the previous franchise, as the history and colors of the team remained in Cleveland. The franchise was still alive as a legal entity between 1996 and 1998 and its assets kept in a trust managed by the NFL until Al Lerner became the owner in 1998. That season the Browns were given full expansion team treatment via an expansion draft and receiving the number one overall draft pick of the 1999 NFL Draft.

The Browns' offense and defense both finished in the bottom of the league. The Browns scored 217 points and gained 3,762 yards of total offense, both last in the NFL. The Browns allowed 437 points and gave up 6,046 yards, ranking 29th and 31st, respectively.

Season information
During the course of the 1995 season, then-Browns owner Art Modell announced his decision to move the Browns to Baltimore. Modell's new team would begin playing in the 1996 season. It would be the first time since 1935 that Cleveland would be left without an existing football team and the first time since 1943 without a team playing, when the Cleveland Rams suspended operation for one year, so the other teams could have enough players during World War II.

However, many Browns fans and Cleveland city officials were determined to keep the team in Cleveland, and orchestrated a grassroots movement to keep the team in Cleveland. The NFL responded by working with city officials, and the two parties came to a unique agreement which would provide the city with a brand-new, state-of-the-art stadium and would promise the return of professional football to Cleveland by the beginning of the 1999 season. Modell also agreed to relinquish the Browns' name, colors and team history to the new owner of the Browns. Modell's new team would begin playing in the 1996 season as the Baltimore Ravens.

While the Browns' new stadium was being built on the site of the old Cleveland Stadium, the foundation of the front office was being set in place. Al Lerner won a bidding war for the new team for $750 million. Lerner hired former San Francisco 49ers front office staffers Carmen Policy and Dwight Clark as the Browns' president and vice president.

Football finally returned to Cleveland on September 12 when the Browns opened the season against the Pittsburgh Steelers at home; Cleveland native Drew Carey was present and gave a rousing pre-game speech. However, the fans were sorely disappointed as the Browns were defeated by the Steelers 43–0. The team would go on to lose their first seven games, but finally in week 8 of their inaugural season the "New Browns" got their first ever win over the New Orleans Saints.  From the Browns' 42-yard line Tim Couch squared up and threw a Hail Mary pass that was tipped in the endzone by Saints defenders but then caught by the Browns' Kevin Johnson. The dramatic game-winning touchdown play happened in the last two seconds of the game, causing the final score to be 21–16. Two weeks later, the Browns defeated the Steelers in Pittsburgh, 16–15, for their second and final win of the year.

The Browns finished the season 2–14—sixth in the AFC Central. It was, at the time, the worst record that the Browns had ever compiled at the end of a season. Since then, the Browns finished with worse records in 2016 and 2017.  The Browns did not win a home game throughout the season.

Draft

Expansion Draft

Below are players selected from other teams in the Cleveland Expansion Draft, in order of selection.

^ Made roster.

1999 NFL Draft

Personnel

Staff

Final roster

Preseason

Hall of Fame Game
 Cleveland Browns 20, Dallas Cowboys 17 (Overtime)

Regular season

Schedule

Season summary

Week 1: vs. Pittsburgh Steelers

After being deactivated for three seasons, the Cleveland Browns returned to the NFL, playing their first game since December 24, 1995 and first home game since December 17, 1995. The game was featured on ESPN Sunday Night Football and a pre-game speech was given by comedian Drew Carey, a Cleveland native. The celebration would be short-lived as the Steelers would shutout the Browns 43–0. The Browns would finish the game with only 40 yards of total offense and committed four turnovers and had a time of possession of just 12:11.

Week 2: at Tennessee Titans

Kicker Phil Dawson made a 41-yard field goal in the second quarter, scoring the Browns' first points of the season. Cleveland would score its first touchdown of the season in the third quarter, with a 39-yard pass from Tim Couch to Kevin Johnson. Despite this, the Titans thrashed the Browns 26–9.

Week 3: at Baltimore Ravens

This was the first meeting between the reactivated Cleveland Browns and the Baltimore Ravens, the latter of which previously played in Cleveland as the Browns from 1946 to 1995 before a controversial relocation. As a compromise by the NFL, the Browns were officially deactivated in 1996 while the team in Baltimore was considered an expansion team. The game would be a defensive battle with poor offensive performance, as both teams committed three turnovers. The Browns, down by seven with 2:34 to go, had the ball and were looking to tie the game, but Tim Couch threw an interception to Chris McAlister. The Ravens would run out the clock to win the game.

Week 4: vs. New England Patriots

Week 5: vs. Cincinnati Bengals

Week 6: at Jacksonville Jaguars

Week 7: at St. Louis Rams

Week 8: at New Orleans Saints

The 0–7 Browns headed to New Orleans to take on the 1–6 Saints. The Saints would score first, with quarterback Billy Joe Hobert throwing a five yard touchdown pass to wide receiver Keith Poole. The Browns would respond midway through the second quarter with fullback Marc Edwards on a 27-yard catch-and-run from Tim Couch to tie the game at 7–7. New Orleans kicker Doug Brien made a 49-yard field goal in the waning seconds of the first half to put the Saints up 10–7. Cleveland would take its first lead of the game with a 24-yard touchdown pass from Couch to wide receiver Kevin Johnson in the third quarter. Brien would make two more field goals, giving the Saints a 16–14 lead with just 0:21 left in the game. Cleveland started the final drive at its own 25-yard line, needing to score a touchdown in under 15 seconds to win the game. On the first play, Couch's pass to wide receiver Darrin Chiaverini fell incomplete, being broken up by Willie Clay. The next play, Couch completed a 19-yard pass to Leslie Shepherd to the Cleveland 44-yard line. Head coach Chris Palmer would immediately call a timeout with just 0:02 left. Down to the Browns' last chance for a win, Couch would heave up a 56-yard Hail Mary that was caught by Johnson in the end zone for the game-winning touchdown. With the last-second win, the Browns got their first victory since being reactivated and was the franchise's first win since December 17, 1995.

The Browns had 243 yards of total offense and maintained possession of the ball for only 19:10; the Saints had 351 total yards and possessed the ball for 40:50. However, Cleveland only turned the ball over once while New Orleans had five turnovers.

Week 9: vs. Baltimore Ravens

Fresh off their first win since 1995, the Browns hoped to get revenge on the Ravens and get two wins in a row. However, thanks to a flurry of touchdowns and field goals by the Ravens, the Browns lost 41-9 and fell to 1-8.

Week 10: at Pittsburgh Steelers

The Browns traveled to Pittsburgh to square off against the Steelers, hoping to get revenge on what happened on opening day. In the first half, the Browns had a 7-3 lead. However, by the second half, their lead disappeared as the Steelers lead 15-13. With almost no time remaining, Phil Dawson made a 39-yard field goal, as the Browns defeated the Steelers 16-15; securing their second win of the season.

Week 11: vs. Carolina Panthers

Week 12: vs. Tennessee Titans

Week 13: at San Diego Chargers

The Browns faced the 4–7 Chargers in San Diego. The first quarter started low-key as both teams notched field goals, respectively from Phil Dawson (33 yards) and John Carney (44 yards). However, by the second quarter, San Diego dominated the rest of the game, with touchdowns from Kenny Bynum and Jermaine Fazande, leading the Chargers to victory.

Week 14: at Cincinnati Bengals

Week 15: vs. Jacksonville Jaguars

Week 16: vs. Indianapolis Colts

On a cold and windy afternoon, the 2–13 Browns hosted the 12–2 Colts, looking to end the season on a high note. The Browns led for most of the game and were up 28–19 at the beginning of the fourth, but were shutout in the final quarter as the Colts scored ten unanswered points to win 29–28.

Standings

References

External links 
 1999 Cleveland Browns at Pro Football Reference (Profootballreference.com)
 1999 Cleveland Browns Statistics at jt-sw.com
 1999 Cleveland Browns Schedule at jt-sw.com
 1999 Cleveland Browns at DatabaseFootball.com

Cleveland
Cleveland Browns seasons
Cleveland